WIPO GREEN is a World Intellectual Property Organization program that supports global efforts to address climate change and food security through sharing of sustainable technology innovations . WIPO GREEN was established in 2013, it is a free online marketplace for technology exchange connecting providers and seekers of inventions and innovations in environmental technology. WIPO GREEN acts as platform for innovators, small and medium enterprises, Fortune 500 companies, and other key stakeholders to take part in green technology innovation and increase diffusion with the help of intellectual property rights through services such as the database, network, and projects. Under the management of WIPO’s Global Challenges Division, WIPO GREEN consists of three main elements: 1) the online database of sustainable technologies uploads and needs, 2) Acceleration Projects, and 3) the WIPO GREEN partners network.

WIPO GREEN database 
The WIPO GREEN database is the foundation of the platform. The database is a free, solutions-oriented, global innovation catalog that connects needs for solving environmental or climate change problems with sustainable solutions from prototypes to marketable products available for sale, license, collaborations, knowledge transfer, joint ventures, or collaborations. Green technology innovators can promote their products, businesses, organizations, and governments looking for green technologies can explain their needs and seek collaboration with providers.

As of July 2022, WIPO GREEN has over 120,000 technologies,  need sand experts, more than 2000 users in 110 countries, and recorded over 1000 connections made between technology providers and seekers.

The database utilizes AI-assisted auto-matching, user uploads tracing and alerts, full-text search for solutions based on long need descriptions, and the Patent2Solution search function for finding commercial applications of a patent, which are some of the unique features of the database. Free registration is required for detailed record view and uploading.

All technologies uploaded to the WIPO GREEN database remain the property of the rights holder. It is up to the right holder and the collaborating parties to structure agreements in the manner they feel is most appropriate and effective.

WIPO GREEN does not require that technologies or innovations uploaded to the database be patented or in the process of being patented. Therefore, technology providers can upload their technology while related patent applications are pending. Technology providers are encouraged to upload technology solutions on the WIPO GREEN database and connect with other users to explore partnerships, technology transfers, including funding and licensing opportunities.

Acceleration Projects 

Acceleration projects work with WIPO GREEN partners and local organizations to explore local challenges and green opportunities for particular environmental needs. These projects are organized annually in different countries or regions around and connect providers and seekers of green technologies.

For example, the Latin America Acceleration Project explores innovative new technologies in the region and facilitates green technology exchange between providers and seekers in green opportunities in intensified crop rotation, soil re-carbonization, and forest management in Argentina; zero-till or conservation agriculture in Brazil; and wine production in Chile.

In October 2021, a project in Indonesia on palm oil mill effluent (POME), a by-product of palm oil production that emits greenhouse gases and reportedly harms flora and fauna in local rivers, identified viable green solutions to turn the high organic content of POME wastewater into biogas and other environmentally friendly uses. 

Former projects took place in Cambodia, Indonesia, and the Philippines around wastewater treatment, agriculture, and water technologies.

Partners Network 
WIPO GREEN partners are public or private institutions that wish to collaborate to advance WIPO GREEN’s mission. The network is aimed at helping the implementation and diffusion of green technology innovations around the world.  Partners include government institutions, intergovernmental organizations, academia, and businesses – from small and medium-sized enterprises to Fortune 500 companies. 

As of 2022, WIPO GREEN has a network of over 146 partner organizations involved in green technology.

References 

Databases
World Intellectual Property Organization
Sustainable technologies